Monolith of Death Tour '96–'97 is a DVD by American death metal band, Cannibal Corpse. It was originally released in 1997 on VHS, but was re-released five years later on DVD in 2002. It features footage from various concerts during the Monolith of Death Tour.

Track listing
Perverse Suffering
Monolith
Pulverized
Fucked With a Knife
Bloodlands
Gutted
A Skull Full of Maggots
Mummified In Barbed Wire
Orgasm Through Torture
Devoured by Vermin
Stripped, Raped and Strangled
Hammer Smashed Face

Special features
Bonus interview footage
Discography
Photo gallery
Uncensored video for "Devoured by Vermin"

References

Cannibal Corpse video albums
1997 video albums
1997 live albums
Live video albums
Metal Blade Records live albums
Metal Blade Records video albums